Roger Hope Elletson (1727—28 November 1775, Bath) was a Jamaican planter.

Early life
Roger was the younger son of Richard and Susanna Elletson.  The family owned the Hope Estate near Kingston, one of the first sugar plantations in Jamaica. 

He was educated at Eton College and went on to Trinity College, Cambridge, matriculating in 1746.

Planter and politician
Roger Hope Elletson returned to Jamaica and is recorded as the owner of an estate called "Merrymans Hill" in St Andrew, Jamaica, which spanned 600 acres. By 1753, he had enslaved 93 Africans.
In the 1760s his brother and his mother died, leaving him in possession of the Hope Estate.

He also pursued a political career and was elected as a Member of the House of Assembly for Port Royal. Then in 1757, he was appointed to the Royal Council. Elletson served as Lieutenant Governor of Jamaica from 1767 to 1768.

Elletson died when on a visit to Bath, England in 1775. He was survived by his wife Anna, who inherited the Hope Estate.

References

1723 births
1775 deaths
Alumni of Trinity College, Cambridge
Burials in Somerset
British slave owners
People educated at Eton College